The Sokli mine is a large mine reserve located in the Lapland. Sokli represents one of the largest phosphates reserve in Finland having estimated reserves of 12.4 billion tonnes of ore grading 24% P2O5.

See also

References 

Phosphate mines in Finland
Savukoski